Daniel Nestor and Nenad Zimonjić were the defending champions, but decided not to participate together.
Zimonjić partnered up with Jürgen Melzer, while Nestor played alongside Max Mirnyi. These pairs were both eliminated by eventual champions Santiago González and Scott Lipsky, who won in the final against Bob Bryan and Mike Bryan 5–7, 6–2, [12–10].

Seeds
All seeds received a bye into the second round.

Draw

Finals

Top half

Bottom half

References
Main Draw

Doubles